Lidija Vučković (Serbian Cyrillic: Лидија Вучковић; born 10 February 1988) is a Serbian professional basketball player.

Club career
With Hemofarm she won 1 national Championships (2008–09) and 2 national cup (2008–09, 2009–10), with Partizan she won 3 national Championships (2010–11, 2011–12, 2012–13), 3 national cup (2010–11, 2012–13, 2017–18) and 2 Adriatic League Women (2011–12, 2012–13), and the Radivoj Korać she won 1 national Championships (2015–16)

Honours
Hemofarm
 National Championship of Serbia (1): 2008–09
 National Cup of Serbia (2): 2008–09, 2009–10

Partizan 
 National Championship of Serbia (3): 2010–11, 2011–12, 2012–13
 National Cup of Serbia (3): 2010–11, 2012–13, 2017–18
 Adriatic League Women (2): 2011–12, 2012–13

Radivoj Korać 
 National Championship of Serbia (1): 2015–16

References

External links
 Profile at eurobasket.com

1988 births
Living people
Basketball players from Belgrade
Serbian women's basketball players
ŽKK Partizan players
Shooting guards
ŽKK Vršac players
ŽKK Radivoj Korać players